Peter Moffatt (15 April 1922 – 21 October 2007) was an English television director.

His work includes Crane (1963), All Creatures Great and Small (1978) and The Gentle Touch (1980). He also directed the BBC science fiction television series Doctor Who serials State of Decay (1980), The Visitation (1982), Mawdryn Undead (1983), The Five Doctors (1983) The Twin Dilemma (1984) and The Two Doctors (1985).

References

External links
 Obituary in The Times, 16 November 2007 

1922 births
2007 deaths
English television directors
BBC people